Marek Szpera (born 9 September 1987) is a Polish handball player for Energa MKS Kalisz and the Polish national team.

He competed at the 2013 World Men's Handball Championship.

References

1987 births
Living people
Polish male handball players
People from Ostrów Wielkopolski